Mirgaani Gomaa Rizgalla (born 1946) is a Sudanese boxer. He competed in the men's welterweight event at the 1972 Summer Olympics.

References

1946 births
Living people
Sudanese male boxers
Olympic boxers of Sudan
Boxers at the 1972 Summer Olympics
Place of birth missing (living people)
Welterweight boxers